Bakaitis is a Lithuanian surname. Notable people with the surname include:

Helmut Bakaitis (born 1944), Australian actor and screenwriter
Vyt Bakaitis (born 1940), Lithuanian-born American translator, editor, and poet

Lithuanian-language surnames
Surnames of Lithuanian origin